The genus Carduelis
is a group of birds in the finch family Fringillidae.

The genus Carduelis was introduced by the French zoologist Mathurin Jacques Brisson in 1760 by tautonomy based on Carl Linnaeus's specific epithet for the European goldfinch Fringilla carduelis. The name carduelis is the Latin word for the European goldfinch.

Many bird species were at one time assigned to the genus, but it became clear from phylogenetic studies of mitochondrial and nuclear DNA sequences that the genus was polyphyletic. The polyphyletic nature of the genus was confirmed by Dario Zuccon and coworkers in a comprehensive study of the finch family published in 2012. The authors suggested splitting the genus into several monophyletic clades, a proposal that was accepted by the International Ornithologists' Union. The siskins and goldfinches from the Americas formed a distinct clade and were moved to the resurrected genus Spinus, the greenfinches were moved to the genus Chloris, the twite and linnets formed another clade and were moved to the genus Linaria and finally the redpolls were moved to the genus Acanthis.

Species
The genus Carduelis is now restricted to three European species:

References

External links
Carduelis videos, photos and sounds on the Internet Bird Collection

 
Bird genera
Taxa named by Mathurin Jacques Brisson